Pagoda is the debut album by Pagoda. It was recorded in Milan, and was released in 2007.

Following the completion of the album, band members Jamie and Indigo left the band. Luca stepped in to play bass, but has since taken the role as sound man for the 2007 European tour, and will remain Pagoda's producer. In January 2006, the band launched a tour in support of the album, which was released by Ecstatic Peace!.

Track listing
All tracks written by Michael Pitt, except where noted.
 "Lesson Learned"
 "Amego"
 "Fetus"
 "Voices"
 "Death to Birth"
 "Botus"
 "Sadartha"
 "Alone"
 "Fear Cloud" (Pitt/Ryan Donowho/Jamie Kallend/Indigo Ruth-Davis)
 "I Do / Cellos / Song 1" (Pitt/Donowho/Kallend/Ruth-Davis)

Personnel

Pagoda
 Michael Pitt – guitar, vocals
 Indigo Ruth-Davis – cello
 Jamie Kallend – bass
 Ryan Donowho – drums

Additional musicians
 Susan Highsmith – backing vocals on «Death to Birth»
 Christian Zucconi – guitar on «Death to Birth»
 Nicole Vicius – spoken word on «Death to Birth», backing vocals on «Alone»
 Jamie Bochert – backing vocals on «Alone»

Production
 Luca Amendolara – audio engineer, mixing, producer
 Hugh Pool – mixing, producer
 Ethan Donaldson – engineer
 Sarah Register – mastering
 Ken Rich – mastering

Release history 

2007 albums
Ecstatic Peace! albums
Pagoda (band) albums